Herlen Ragland (February 2, 1896 – August 12, 1960) was an American Negro league pitcher in the 1920s.

A native of Buffalo Valley, Tennessee, Ragland made his Negro leagues debut in 1920 with the Dayton Marcos and Indianapolis ABCs. The following season, he played for the Columbus Buckeyes during the team's only season in the Negro National League. Ragland died in Kansas City, Missouri in 1960 at age 64. He is also listed in some sources as "Clifton Ragland."

References

External links
 and Baseball-Reference Black Baseball stats and Seamheads

1896 births
1960 deaths
Columbus Buckeyes (Negro leagues) players
Dayton Marcos players
Indianapolis ABCs players
20th-century African-American sportspeople
Baseball pitchers